Trail running is a sport-activity that combines running, and, where there are steep gradients, hiking, that is run "on any unpaved surface". It is similar to both mountain and fell running (also known as hill running). Mountain running may, however, include paved sections. Trail running normally takes place in warm climates, on good paths, or tracks that are relatively easy to follow, and does not necessarily involve the significant amounts of ascent, or need for navigating skills, normal in fell running. Unlike road running and track running, it generally takes place on hiking trails, often in mountainous terrain, where there can be much larger ascents and descents. It is difficult to definitively distinguish trail running from cross country running. In general, however, cross country is an IAAF-governed discipline that is typically raced over shorter distances.

The number of organized trail races grew by 1,000% from 2008 to 2018, from 160 to more than 1,800 globally. Runners often cite less impact stress compared to road running, as well as the landscape and non-urban environment, as primary reasons for preferring trail running. This move to nature is also reflected in a large increase in competitors in non-traditional/off-road triathlons and adventure racing in the 2010s.

Related activities

Fastpacking
A growing number of people are participating in solo backcountry trail running trips, carrying an ultralight form of backpacking to allow faster speeds than with a traditional backpack. Running while backpacking has been termed "fastpacking". These trips can be both difficult and dangerous, depending on length, weather, and terrain.

Mountain and fell running
Mountain and fell running (also called hill running, particularly in Scotland) are sports that combine running and racing off-road over the upland country, where the gradient climbed is a significant component. Fell is a dialect word from the northwest of England where it is popular–especially in the Lake District. Fell races require mountain navigation skills and participants carry survival equipment. Unlike trail running, the routes of fell races are often unmarked so that competitors frequently are able to choose their own route to a checkpoint.

The only difference between mountain running and trail running is that a mountain running course sometimes includes paving. It is different from fell running because (1) courses are clearly marked and avoid dangerous sections;
and (2) while mountain running takes place mainly off-road, if there is significant elevation gain on the route, surfaced roads may be used.

Popularity and growth
Trail running has gained in popularity, particularly in the United States. According to a 2010 special report on trail running published by the Outdoor Industry Foundation, "4.8 million Americans ages 6 and older participated in trail running in 2009." This research shows a particularly heavy following in the Mountain States and Pacific Coast States.

Because of the natural or serene setting, trail running is viewed as a more spiritual activity than roadside running or jogging. Another reason for its growth and popularity is the continual acknowledgment of environmentalism. There is emphasis from many trail-race organizers to keep these races "green" or environmentally friendly and minimize disturbance within the natural environment.

Equipment

Many trail runners use specially designed shoes that have aggressively knobby soles that are generally more rigid than road running shoes. The usually EVA compound midsole often contains a lightweight, flexible nylon plastic layer to protect the feet from puncture wounds from sharp rocks or other objects. Since trail running takes place on softer surfaces (e.g., grass, dirt) than road races, cushioning is not as important so often the shoes are less 'cushioned' than their counterparts designed for tarmac. Additionally, trail running shoes are low to the ground which provides the best stability on uneven terrain.  Recently, very thick-sole running shoes are gaining popularity, especially in ultra-marathons.  In events over 100 miles, they were the most common type of shoe used in 2013.

Other equipment includes wicking garments, water bottles, sunscreen, sunglasses, hats, gaiters, insect repellent spray, headlamps, headphones, and ivy block. Some trail runners attach lightweight crampons to the bottom of their shoes to aid with traction in the snow and on ice. An alternative way to carry water is to use a hydration bladder with a drinking tube carried in a backpack, waist pack, or hydration pack. Today, there are many racing vests that are lightweight alternatives that allow runners the choice of reservoir-based bladder or water bottles while allowing for carrying other items such as nutrition, hydration supplements, and cold weather gear. Carrying the Ten Essentials may reduce the hazards inherent in wilderness travel. Some trail runners use ultra-light hiking poles or trekking poles, to increase speed and stability.

Races

Trail running races are organised globally. Due to the relatively short history of trail running as an organised sport, there are very few established organizing bodies. For example, in the United States, the American Trail Running Association was only founded in 1996 to represent trail races in the US. In the United Kingdom, the Trail Running Association was formed in 1991. The International Trail Running Association (ITRA) was founded in 2013, and was first recognized by the IAAF in 2015.

Distances in races vary widely, from 5 km, to over 100 miles (161 km). Many trail races are of ultramarathon (ultra) distance.  Ultras are generally accepted as having a distance of greater than 26.2 miles (42.16 km) though 50 km races are the most common 'standard' ultra distance greater than a marathon. Races of similar distances often differ significantly in terms of terrain. This makes it difficult to compare performance across different courses. This is in contrast to times over standard distances in road running, such as 10 km or marathon.

The International Triathlon Union conducts an annual Cross triathlon Championship race annually. Additionally, the XTERRA Triathlon is a private off-road series that concludes with a championship each year in Maui.

Aid stations 
Aid stations supplying food and beverages are commonly located every 5 to 10 kilometers along the course.  Ultramarathon aid stations are often stocked with dessert foods that provide runners with quickly digestible sugars that can provide a needed boost as their glycogen levels begin to drop.  Most trail races only have a single stage, where competitors are timed over the entire duration of their run, including stops at aid stations. However, trail running stage races also exist. These multiday stage races usually offer complete support and runner amenities between stages. There are, however, stage races that provide no support apart from water and medical aid, and require competitors to carry all their equipment (food, sleeping bag, change of clothes, compass). The best-known example of such races is the Marathon des Sables, which was first held in 1986.

Trail Etiquette (Trail Ethics) 
As with hiking and other activities that share trails in often sensitive wilderness environments, trail runners should comply with common leave no trace practices and other trail etiquette (aka Trail ethics). While trail etiquette and customs vary by country, season and outdoor (recreational) area, the common purpose of trail etiquette is to preserve the wilderness environment while ensuring the safety and enjoyment of all trail users (including people, animals, and sometimes motorized vehicles).

Trail vs. road race participation limitations 
Compared to road races, there are often fewer participants as the number of entries is often limited. There can be a few reasons for this: narrowness of trails, national parks (where the courses are often set) may limit the number of participants via a permitting process, safety, and environmental concerns. There are many popular races such as the Ultra-Trail du Mont-Blanc in Europe or the Western States Endurance Run in the United States that have been forced to limit entries due to overwhelming demand.

Some notable trail races include:

Africa
Fish River Canyon Ultra Marathon
Kalahari Augrabies Extreme Marathon
Mount Cameroon Race of Hope
Rhodes Trail Run

Asia
Coast To Coast Night Trail Ultra: Indonesia, since 2015
Japan Mountain Endurance Race Hasegawa Tsuneo Cup (HASETSUNE CUP): 71.5 km (since 1993)
Trans Japan Alps Race (TJAR): 415 km (since 2002)
Ultra-Trail Mount Fuji (UTMF): 161 km (since 2012)

Europe
 Fruškogorski maraton:  (since 1978) 
 Scenic Trail: 
 Tatry Running Tour
 Tor des Géants: 
 Transvulcania: 
 Ultra-Trail du Mont-Blanc:

North America
Barkley Marathons: 
Bear 100 Mile Endurance Run: 100 miles (160 km)
Dipsea Race:  the oldest trail running event in the US
Hardrock Hundred Mile Endurance Run: 
Leadville Trail 100: 
Western States Endurance Run:

Oceania
 Kepler Challenge:  also includes the Luxmore Grunt  (New Zealand)
 Kokoda Challenge Race:

See also
 Hillwalking
 IAU Trail World Championships
 Skyrunning

References

External links

 
Running by type